The 1993–94 Indiana Hoosiers men's basketball team represented Indiana University. Their head coach was Bobby Knight, who was in his 23rd year. The team played its home games in  Assembly Hall in Bloomington, Indiana, and was a member of the Big Ten Conference.

The Hoosiers finished the regular season with an overall record of 21–9 and a conference record of 12–6, finishing 3rd in the Big Ten Conference. The Hoosiers were invited to participate in the 1994 NCAA tournament, where IU advanced to the Sweet Sixteen for the fourth year in a row.

Roster

Schedule/Results

|-
!colspan=8| Regular Season
|-

|-
!colspan=8| NCAA tournament

References

Indiana Hoosiers men's basketball seasons
Indiana
Indiana
1993 in sports in Indiana
1994 in sports in Indiana